William C. Campbell may refer to:
 Wilburn C. Campbell (1910–1997), Episcopal bishop of West Virginia (common misspelling of first name)
 William C. Campbell (golfer) (1923–2013), American golfer
 William C. Campbell (scientist) (born 1930), Irish biochemist and Nobel laureate